is a Japanese football player.

Club statistics

References

External links

1987 births
Living people
Hannan University alumni
Association football people from Yamaguchi Prefecture
Japanese footballers
J1 League players
J2 League players
Omiya Ardija players
Avispa Fukuoka players
Expatriate footballers in Cambodia
Association football midfielders
Angkor Tiger FC players
Angkor Tiger FC managers
Universiade bronze medalists for Japan
Universiade medalists in football
Japanese football managers
Medalists at the 2009 Summer Universiade
Japanese expatriate sportspeople in Cambodia